Serine/threonine-protein phosphatase 2A regulatory subunit B'' subunit beta is an enzyme that in humans is encoded by the PPP2R3B gene.

Function 

Protein phosphatase 2 (formerly named type 2A) is one of the four major Ser/Thr phosphatases and is implicated in the negative control of cell growth and division. Protein phosphatase 2 holoenzymes are heterotrimeric proteins composed of a structural subunit A, a catalytic subunit C, and a regulatory subunit B. The regulatory subunit is encoded by a diverse set of genes that have been grouped into the B/PR55, B'/PR61, and B''/PR72 families. These different regulatory subunits confer distinct enzymatic specificities and intracellular localizations to the holozenzyme. The product of this gene belongs to the B'' family. The B'' family has been further divided into subfamilies. The product of this gene belongs to the beta subfamily of regulatory subunit B''. Alternative splicing results in multiple transcript variants encoding different isoforms.

Interactions 

PPP2R3B has been shown to interact with PPP2R1B, PPP2R1A, CDC6 and PPP2CA.

References

Further reading